Lorne B. Groom (May 13, 1919 – July 24, 1994) was an optometrist and political figure in New Brunswick, Canada. He represented Charlotte County in the Legislative Assembly of New Brunswick from 1952 to 1957 as a Progressive Conservative member.

He was born in Bocabec, Charlotte County, New Brunswick, the son of J. M. Groom. During World War II, he served overseas with the Canadian Army, Carleton and York Regiment, rising to the rank of lieutenant. Groom lost both legs during the war. At home, he served as president of the St. Croix Branch of the Canadian Legion.

In 1946, Lorne Groom married Ruth Lucille Lindsay. They made their home in St. Stephen where he was a practising optometrist.

In the June 10, 1957 Canadian federal election, Groom ran unsuccessfully for a seat in the House of Commons. The Progressive Conservative Party of Canada candidate in the riding of New Brunswick Southwest, he lost to incumbent Wesley Stuart.

Lorne Groom died in 1994 and is buried in the St. Stephen Rural Cemetery.

See also
List of people with surname Groom

References 
 Canadian Parliamentary Guide, 1958, PG Normandin

1919 births
1994 deaths
Canadian optometrists
Canadian military personnel of World War II
Progressive Conservative Party of New Brunswick MLAs
New Brunswick candidates for Member of Parliament
People from Charlotte County, New Brunswick